Jerrod Bettis is an American music producer, composer, and musician. Bettis has composed songs for Adele, The Lonely Island, Melissa Etheridge, KJ-52, and more. He has also produced work for artists including Hilary Duff, Gavin DeGraw, Needtobreathe, Birdy, Melissa Etheridge, and The Lonely Island.

Bettis has been nominated for an Emmy Award in 2011 for his work on The Lonely Island's "I Just Had Sex".

References 

Year of birth missing (living people)
Living people
Record producers from Colorado